Hamish MacDonald is a Canadian author of four novels and an independent publisher who hand-binds all his books. He has lived in Canada and Scotland.

In 1999 MacDonald wrote and self-published his first novel. DoubleZero, a Y2K-themed novel, was Broken Pencil magazine's Spring 2000 "Book of the Issue".  The review in Toronto's NOW magazine, written by Bert Archer, said "Amid the dystopian clamour, a thoughtful, light, original and -- just for a change -- utopian look at the beginning of the new millennium."

In 2006 MacDonald released his second and third novels, The Willies and Idea in Stone, under his own imprint: typesetting, printing and binding each copy himself  from a home studio in Scotland. His fourth novel Finitude which deals with the possibilities of future climate chaos was published under the same imprint in 2009.

Indie publishing

As well as being an indie publisher, MacDonald is active in promoting simple printing and bookbinding techniques which require minimal training and little or no specialist equipment, and he teaches workshops on hand bookbinding at events such as the Edinburgh Independent Radical Book Fair. He also hosts the free podcast 'DIY Book', which teaches aspiring novelists how to write, make, and sell their own books.

Bibliography
 Double Zero (Coach House Press/Hamish MacDonald, 1999)
 The Willies (Hamish MacDonald, 2006)
 Idea in Stone (Hamish MacDonald, 2006)
 Finitude (Hamish MacDonald, 2009)

See also
Climate fiction

References

External links 
 Hame.Land - Author's website
 Work Inspiration with Hamish MacDonald - Interview on Workspiration

Canadian science fiction writers
Living people
Scottish writers
Small press publishing companies
Year of birth missing (living people)